Halifax Transit is a Canadian public transport service operating buses and ferries in Halifax, Nova Scotia. Founded as Metro Transit in March 1981, the agency runs two ferry routes, 66 conventional bus routes (including corridor, local, and express services), three regional express routes (called MetroX), and three rural routes. Halifax Transit also operates Access-a-Bus, a door-to-door paratransit service for senior and disabled citizens.

Total ridership in the 2019/20 reporting year was about 30.4 million, with the system carrying an average of 99,320 on weekdays. According to the 2016 census, Halifax had the seventh-highest proportion of workers taking transit to work among Canadian cities.

History

Preceding services
Halifax was among the first Canadian cities to be served by an integrated public transportation system, pre-dated only by Toronto, Montreal and Quebec City.

The city's first transit service came with establishment of the Dartmouth ferry service, first chartered in 1752. In 1816, the sail-powered ferry was replaced by a horse-powered boat, and in 1830 with a steam ferry. While private omnibus services are known to have begun in the city at least as early as 1854, the roots of Halifax Transit date back to June 11, 1866.

The Halifax City Railroad Company (HCR) began operations with five horse-drawn trams on rails that stretched from the corner of Barrington Street and Inglis Street in the south end to the city’s first railway station, near the corner of Duffus Street and Campbell Road (now Barrington Street), in the north end.

Notwithstanding a ten-year hiatus, horse-drawn street railway services continued in Halifax until April 1896 when the system, now operated by the Halifax Electric Tramway Company, completed the conversion to electric-powered operation. The street railway served Halifax until March 1949, when the war-worn trams were replaced by "trackless" electric trolley coaches.

The bright yellow trolleys, operated by utility company Nova Scotia Light and Power, plied city streets exclusively until 1963, when they were supplemented by diesel buses for the first time. The system became all-diesel on January 1, 1970, the same day the City of Halifax took over operation. Some of Halifax's T-44 trolleybuses were sold to the Toronto Transit Commission for parts for their Western Flyer E-700A.

Dartmouth Transit provided transit service in Dartmouth, a separate city at that time.

Unification

Metro Transit, a single transit agency serving all of the greater Halifax-Dartmouth metropolitan area, began operations in March 1981. The system was created by the Metropolitan Authority, an agency representing the former cities of Halifax and Dartmouth as well as suburban Halifax County, to consolidate the transit operations of the Halifax Transit Corporation and Dartmouth Transit.

Metro Transit expanded in 1994 with the absorption of the Dartmouth ferry services formerly operated by the city of Dartmouth. Ownership of the transit service was transferred to the newly created Halifax Regional Municipality when Halifax, Dartmouth, and Halifax County were amalgamated in 1996. Since then, the service has been operated directly by the municipal government, and since October 2010 the agency has reported though the Transportation Standing Committee of Halifax Regional Council. The municipality announced on July 15, 2014 that it was changing the service's name to Halifax Transit to reflect the city's new brand.

Fuel leak 
In 2014, a massive fuel leak spilling close to 200,000 litres of fuel at Halifax Transit's Burnside bus depot went undetected for almost four months. In addition to the cost of lost fuel, cleanup from local environmental damage and groundwater contamination as far as 1 km away cost Halifax Regional Municipality approximately $2.5 million. Before the discovery of the leak, Halifax Transit initially claimed that the excess fuel consumption was caused by higher usage during winter.

The municipal auditor general investigated the incident and recommended that Halifax Transit improve monitoring of fuel usage and inventory and improve training of employees involved in fuel handling.

System redesign
In January 2014, Halifax Regional Council approved a study to look at a major re-design of the city's transit system.  The "Moving Forward Together Plan" (MFTP) was adopted in principal by council in April 2016. Proposed amendments to the plan were defeated in November 2016, with the exception of a change to the route of the Porters Lake MetroX and a short reprieve to attempt to increase ridership to save the #15 bus to York Redoubt.

The Moving Forward Together Plan is Halifax Transit's five-year improvement plan that outlines planned changes to the transit network from late 2016 to 2020. The plan aims to increase the proportion of resources dedicated to high-ridership routes, simplify the system and make it more understandable, improve service quality and reliability, and give priority to transit in the transportation network. The plan created a new classification system for bus routes, designating them as corridor, local, express, regional express, or rural routes. Corridor routes form the backbone of the revamped bus system, providing frequent service connecting transit terminals.

Some critics called the plan inadequate, outlining various criticisms including inefficient and redundant route design, missing data and analysis, a long implementation period causing nuisance to riders, and a lack of network connectivity. In addition, critics characterised the "Moving Forward Together Plan" as disregarding the key principles that Halifax Transit identified through years of public engagement and consultation. Business groups have also noted both the current lack of service, and lack of proposed future service, along key corridors of the region.

The changes proposed under the Moving Forward Together Plan were implemented in stages each year, with the first round of changes taking place during the 2017/18 fiscal year. The latest major round of changes came into effect on 22 November 2021. The final round of MFTP adjustments, originally scheduled to come into effect in November 2022, was (with the exception of the introduction of route 50) postponed to 2023 due to chronic staff shortages during the COVID-19 pandemic.

Operations

Bus services
There are 369 conventional buses in the fleet, all of which are low floor and wheelchair accessible.

Halifax Transit operates 66 conventional bus routes within the Urban Transit Service Boundary, broadly similar to the metropolitan region of Halifax Regional Municipality (Halifax, Dartmouth, Bedford and Sackville), including the areas of Eastern Passage, North Preston/Cherry Brook and Herring Cove. Routes are numbered according to the region or type of service provided. The agency also operates three regional express routes and three rural routes.

The bus fleet is stored and maintained at two depots, namely the Burnside Transit Centre and Ragged Lake Transit Centre.

Corridor routes 
Corridor routes are higher-ridership routes that provide frequent service for most of the day. They serve major destinations and transit terminals. Following the latest round of service adjustments implemented in November 2021, there are ten corridor routes, numbered 1-10.

Corridor routes, considered the backbone of the bus system, operate at headways of 5-15 minutes during peak hours.

Local routes 
Local routes provide connect neighbourhoods to corridor routes (at transit terminals). Local routes operate all day, except for four routes that operate at peak hours only: 26, 50, 57, and 93 (as well as parts of route 51).

Express routes 
Express routes provide limited-stop services to major destinations (e.g. downtown Halifax) at peak hours. Express bus stops are designated with a red route decal.

Express routes are sometimes paired with a local route, providing service along the local route before continuing along the express portion of the journey. For example, route 182 First Lake Express is an extended version of route 82 First Lake. 

This service type consolidated the former MetroLink and "Urban Express" services.

Regional Express routes 

Regional Express routes connect outlying areas to the regional centre. A higher fare is charged for these routes.

Also branded as MetroX, there are three Regional Express routes. These started operating in August 2009 and connect Tantallon, the Airport, and Porters Lake, respectively, to Scotia Square in downtown Halifax. The routes are handicap accessible and have facilities for bicycle carriage.

Among the three Regional Express routes, only route 320 (serving the airport) provides service on the weekend.

Rural routes 
Rural routes provide service to areas outside the Urban Transit Service Boundary which had transit service before the boundary was adopted. There are three such routes, which connect rural areas to the nearest bus terminal.

Ferry services

Halifax Transit also provides two passenger ferry routes, one connecting downtown Halifax with Alderney Landing in Dartmouth, and the other connecting with Woodside. Each route is serviced by a pair of vessels. The ferry services are integrated with the bus services; the fares are identical, and transfers are accepted between the two systems. The harbour ferries board 1.78 million passengers each year. Each ferry carries up to 398 passengers. All routes are handicap accessible and have provision to carry bicycles.

Access-A-Bus
Halifax Transit also provides Access-A-Bus, a dial-a-ride paratransit service for elderly and handicapped residents. This was created in 1981, the same year Metro Transit was formed.

In the 2019/20 financial year, the Access-A-Bus service had approximately 178,500 boardings.

Services

Fares and passes
Halifax Transit offers four main fare categories: Adult (16 years & up), Senior (65+ years), Child (5 – 15 years), and Student (for full-time students with valid student photo ID card). Anyone with a ticket, pass or transfer for the regular service can pay the difference in cash fare to use the more expensive Regional Express (MetroX) service. Monthly passes allow for unlimited use of ferries and buses, and are sold through various channels including municipal service centres, drug stores, some supermarkets, and the convenience store at the Bridge Terminal.

A Canadian National Institute for the Blind (CNIB) identification card can be used to obtain free travel on Halifax Transit's buses and ferries. A university student bus pass (called U-pass) is available to students of Saint Mary's, Mount Saint Vincent, King's College, Dalhousie, Nova Scotia Community College (Halifax campuses) and Nova Scotia College of Art and Design. The cost is included in tuition fees. Halifax Transit offers a low-income bus pass sold for 50 per cent of the regular price to eligible applicants.

In 2021, Halifax Transit launched a pilot program to provide high school students with free transit passes. The program aims to provide youth with convenient transportation and encourage the use of public transit. The program is currently being piloted at four schools, namely Dartmouth High School, École Mosaïque, École du Sommet, and Prince Andrew High School. In November 2022, council voted to expand the program to four Dartmouth junior high schools.

Transfers are issued upon request on all Halifax Transit buses and ferries. A transfer allows the user to transfer between multiple conventional route buses and ferries travelling in any direction without having to pay an additional fare. A transfer also allows users to transfer to MetroX buses at a reduced fare. Transfers are valid for 90 minutes after the last scheduled stop on the current run of the route where it was issued. Holders of a valid XPass (the monthly pass for the MetroX) do not require transfers.

Schedules and route information
Route information can be accessed through the Halifax Transit Departures number 902 480 8000. Individual route schedules are available on Halifax Transit's website. Most terminals have screens that display anticipated arrival times of buses that service the terminal.

Departures
In early 2016, Halifax Transit released their next-generation AVL-based system called Departures. The system was first launched on May 15, 2016, with the introduction of the Departures Line, and as of July 2016 the rollout of the updated Departures Board that replaces the older GoTime departure displays found at terminals across the system. The Departures Board works similar to the previous GoTime-based departures display, with the exception that instead of showing the next two bus arrival times, will display the bay number and the next bus departure time, either showing the next hour and minute or the number of minutes before the bus departs, or "delayed" if the bus is behind by a certain number of minutes. It will also only show buses set to arrive in the next while, versus the older display which would show "(not scheduled)" for any route not running at that point in time.

The Departures Line works similarly to the previous GoTime IVR (Interactive Voice Response) system. Instead of dialling (902) 480- plus the four-digit number found on bus stop signage, one dials (902)-480-8000 and following the voice responses, one would input the bus stop number to access route departure times. The system gives the estimated departure time if available, scheduled times if the bus is not reporting real-time data or is delayed by a number of minutes, adjusted time to depart when schedule adjustments are made, and will announce when a bus is arriving within the minute.

Accessibility
On December 16, 2016 Halifax Transit began piloting an automated stop announcement system on several bus routes, providing both auditory and visual notice of approaching bus stops, as well as announcing the route of each bus on arrival at a bus stop. By January 30, 2017, all conventional buses provided the automated stop announcement. As of June 8, 2017, all conventional buses in the Halifax Transit fleet were low floor and accessible to wheelchairs.

Although Halifax Transit's vehicle fleet is considered accessible, many of the bus stops are not. At some stops, the lack of an appropriate landing area prevents the deployment of a bus wheelchair ramp. Other stops lack sidewalk connections. Halifax Transit is upgrading bus stops and aims to make all stops accessible by 2030.

Transit routes

Route number structure
As mentioned above, the Moving Forward Together Plan created a new classification system for bus routes, which is reflected in a new route numbering system:

 Corridor routes (numbered 1-19)
 Local routes (numbered 20-99) 
 Express routes (numbered 100-199) 
 Regional Express routes (numbered 300-399)
 Rural routes (numbered 400-499)

Current routes
 Wheelchair – Uses Accessible Low Floor (ALF) buses only.
 Rush Hour Service Only. 
 Designated Bike Route. 
 MetroLink Service (see MetroLink section above) MetroX Service (see MetroX section above)Withdrawn

 Rapid Transit Network 
In May 2020, Halifax Transit presented a plan to regional council to implement a new Rapid Transit Strategy. The strategy proposes the creation of a new Rapid Transit Network comprising four new bus rapid transit (BRT) lines and three new ferry routes. The estimated capital cost is around C$300-325 million, while operational costs are estimated at $15-22 million. Halifax Regional Council unanimously endorsed the plan on 26 May 2020. 

As of 2021, Halifax is seeking funding for the project from other levels of government. Funding for the planning and design of one of the proposed ferry routes, the Halifax-Mill Cove (Bedford) service, was announced in June 2021. Halifax Transit plans to launch the service in 2024.

In popular culture
 The characters of Phillip and Phillmore the ferry twins from the children's TV show Theodore Tugboat'' are modelled after the Halifax-Dartmouth ferries.

See also
 Transportation in the Halifax Regional Municipality

Notes

References

External links
 
 
 Route map
 Schedules, maps for individual routes, riders guide

1981 establishments in Nova Scotia
Bus transport in Nova Scotia
Ferry companies of Nova Scotia
Intermodal transport authorities in Canada
Paratransit services in Canada
Transit agencies in Nova Scotia
Transport in Halifax, Nova Scotia